Famous is the debut album by the American alternative rock band Super Deluxe, released in 1995. The album was remastered and rereleased the following year by the Warner Bros. Records subsidiary Revolution Records, with an extra track.

Production
The album was produced by Martin Feveyer, Gavin Guss and Super Deluxe. The former Posie Mike Musberger contributed percussion to Famous. The band's demo tape of Famous served as the Tim/Kerr release.

Critical reception

Trouser Press wrote: "On its brief, splendid debut, the young Seattle foursome Super Deluxe demonstrates a clear awareness of ’90s noise but primarily brings Squeeze-like harmonic subtlety to winning originals rooted in that nonexistent netherworld between the original British Invaders and their softhearted new wave receptors." 

USA Today thought that "the honey-coated tunes of Braden Blake and John Kirsh are stirred and shaken by feverish rhythms and punchy guitars, then topped by creamy harmonies." The Albuquerque Journal called the band "tuneful in its own right," but wrote that the album "gets downright boring as [it] plods along after an energetic opening." The Austin American-Statesman opined that "the singer and his many voice overdubs recall the Rembrandts, while the guitars are dull, dull, dull."

AllMusic praised the "upbeat, sugary songs bursting with catchy hooks and sing-along choruses."

Track listing

References

1995 debut albums
Tim/Kerr Records albums